Oscar Isao Torres Takata (born May 21, 1992, in Guadalajara, Jalisco) is a Mexican professional footballer who last played for Loros de la Universidad de Colima. He made his professional debut with the Loros during an Ascenso MX match against Tampico Madero on 27 August 2016.

References

1992 births
Living people
Mexican footballers
Loros UdeC footballers
Ascenso MX players
Liga Premier de México players
Tercera División de México players
Footballers from Guadalajara, Jalisco
Association footballers not categorized by position